Ronald Raymond Zubar (born 20 September 1985) is a Guadeloupean former professional footballer who played as a defender.

Zubar's efforts at French club Stade Malherbe Caen earned him a move to Olympique de Marseille in 2006. His time at Marseille ended sourly though, after some individual errors saw fans turn against him and him relegated to the sidelines. He found an exit in English Premier League club Wolverhampton Wanderers, for whom he signed in 2009 and remained until 2013.

Club career

Caen
Born in Les Abymes, Guadeloupe, one of France's overseas regions, Zubar began his professional football career at Ligue 2 side Stade Malherbe Caen and was part of their youth team, which were runners-up in the 2001 Gambardella Cup. He made his first team debut for Caen against fellow Ligue 2 side Lorient on 8 March 2003, which ended in a goalless draw.

Zubar sustained a run of games in the first team and helped his team win promotion to Ligue 1 in the 2003–04 season. He was part of the team that reached the French League Cup Final in 2005. However Caen was relegated at the end of the season, finishing in 18th place in Ligue 1. Zubar remained with the club for another season as he tried to help them back into Ligue 1, but this was unsuccessful. Despite Caen's failure to get promotion, he was named as the best defensive midfielder in Ligue 2's Team of the Year. He made a total of 96 appearances for Caen, scoring two goals.

Marseille

After speculation over his future at Caen, being linked with English Premier League team Arsenal and fellow Ligue 1 rivals Lyon and Bordeaux, Zubar finally joined Olympique de Marseille on 15 June 2006, signing a four-year contract for an undisclosed fee. His first season with the team saw him narrowly miss out on two honours as Marseille finished runners-up in Ligue 1 to Lyon, and lost the French Cup Final; Zubar himself missed the decisive penalty in the shootout in the final against Sochaux, after a 2–2 draw.

At the start of the 2007–08 season, he was converted to defence, playing various games at centre back and right back, instead of his previous defensive midfield role. This campaign was hard for Zubar as he found himself under pressure from fans after several costly mistakes in defence, in a season that only brought the club third place in Ligue 1. He made a total of 98 appearances for the club, scoring three goals, before leaving the club in the summer of 2009.

Wolverhampton Wanderers

On 4 July 2009, Zubar signed for newly promoted English Premier League club Wolverhampton Wanderers on a four-year deal for an undisclosed fee, believed to be in the region of £2.5 million. After a long period of adjustment due to the language barrier and a newborn child in France, he finally made his Premier League debut on 17 October 2009 in a 1–1 draw at Everton, almost two months after he had made his club debut during a League Cup tie against Swindon on 25 August 2009. He scored his first Wolves goal in a 3–1 win at relegation rivals West Ham on 23 March 2010, as the team progressed toward retaining their top flight survival.

Zubar made a further 18 appearances for Wolves during the 2010–11 campaign, but his season was ended two months early after he underwent back surgery. This injury kept him out of first team contention until November 2011, but soon after his return he suffered a further injury setback when he damaged his knee and so missed several more months. He played in the final months of the season – receiving a red card in a defeat to Manchester United – which ended with the club suffering relegation to the Championship.

During the close season Zubar said that he wanted to remain at Wolves despite their relegation and was keen to extend his contract that had one year left to run. However, new manager Ståle Solbakken rarely used the defender, and revealed that he was content for him to leave in the January transfer window. Although Solbakken was soon sacked and his replacement Dean Saunders immediately recalled Zubar to the starting XI, he still exited the club during January 2013 after making 69 appearances (scoring four goals) in total for the club.

Return to France
On 30 January 2013, Ligue 1 club Ajaccio announced that Zubar had joined them in an eighteen-month deal after Wolves agreed to release him from his contract. He made a total of 38 league appearances for Ajaccio, scoring two goals.

New York Red Bulls
On 27 January 2015, the New York Red Bulls of Major League Soccer announced that they had signed Zubar. Zubar made his debut for New York on 8 March 2015 appearing as a starter in a 1–1 draw at Sporting Kansas City. After being out for a couple of months due to injury, Zubar returned to the starting lineup on 17 June 2015 scoring New York's second goal in a 3–0 US Open Cup victory over Atlanta Silverbacks. After another month away due to injury Zubar made his return to the field on 12 August 2015, this time starting for New York Red Bulls II  in a 1–1  draw against Charlotte Independence.

On 24 July 2016, during the third Hudson River Derby match of the season; Zubar scored his club's second goal of the match en route to a 4–1 victory over New York City FC.

Zubar was released by the Red Bulls at the end of the 2016 season.

International career
Zubar has represented France at under-16, under-17, under-18 and under-21 level. He was part of the French under-17 side which reached the final of the 2002 European Under-17 Championships.

He has represented Guadeloupe, which is the French overseas department he is originally from, at full international level though. As they are not a FIFA member and part of France, he is still eligible to play for France at senior level too.

Personal life
His younger brother, Stéphane and his cousin Claude Dielna are also professional footballers.

Career statistics

Club

Honours
New York Red Bulls
MLS Supporters' Shield : 2015

References

External links

MLS Player profile

1985 births
Living people
Association football defenders
Guadeloupean footballers
Guadeloupe international footballers
French footballers
France youth international footballers
France under-21 international footballers
Stade Malherbe Caen players
Olympique de Marseille players
Wolverhampton Wanderers F.C. players
AC Ajaccio players
New York Red Bulls players
New York Red Bulls II players
Ligue 2 players
Ligue 1 players
Premier League players
English Football League players
Major League Soccer players
USL Championship players
French expatriate footballers
French expatriate sportspeople in the United States
Expatriate footballers in England
Expatriate soccer players in the United States
French people of Guadeloupean descent